USS Virginia (SSN-774) is a nuclear powered cruise missile attack submarine and the lead ship of her class, currently serving in the United States Navy (USN). She is the tenth vessel of the Navy to be named for the Commonwealth of Virginia, as well as the second US Navy attack submarine to be named after a state, a pattern that is common throughout her class.

The contract to build her was awarded to the Electric Boat Division of General Dynamics Corporation in Groton, Connecticut on 30 September 1998 and her keel was laid down on 2 September 1999. She was launched on 16 August 2003 sponsored by Lynda Johnson Robb, the wife of former Virginia governor and senator Charles Robb, and daughter of President of the United States Lyndon B. Johnson and Lady Bird Johnson. She was the first U.S. Navy submarine to be completely designed on a computer. On 10 and 11 March, the prospective submarine shot 12 dummy torpedoes into the Thames River, Connecticut, from each of the boat's four tubes.

Virginia was delivered to the Navy on 12 October 2004, the 104th anniversary of the commissioning of Holland, the Navy's first modern, commissioned submarine. She was commissioned on 23 October 2004 under the command of David J. Kern. The commissioning ceremony was featured in the 2005 television series Submarine: Hidden Hunter on Discovery Channel. This class of submarine is unique in that it features a photonics mast that freed ship designers to place the boat's control room in a lower, less geometrically constrained space than would be required by a standard, optical tube periscope. It is additionally unique in the U.S. Navy for featuring all-digital ship and ballast control systems that are operated by relatively senior watchstanders and a pressure chamber to deploy SEALs, divers or other special forces units while being submerged.

On 23 November 2005, Virginia completed her first deployment in support of the Global War on Terrorism. On 12 January 2006, Virginia entered Electric Boat's shipyard for post-shakedown availability, which was expected to last for most of 2006. In April 2010 the submarine returned from a six-month deployment having covered 37,000 miles.

The submarine completed her first 20-month-long overhaul in May 2012.

Ship's crest 

"Emblazoned on a blue background that symbolizes the mighty deep, Virginia is prominently positioned. The forward view of Virginia denotes her leading the submarine force into a new century and onto a new and exciting course for the United States Navy. The gold lettering and border around the seal combined with the blue background represent the Navy's colors of blue and gold. The silhouette of the Commonwealth of Virginia represents the state for which the boat is named. Each of the nine stars represents an American warship named Virginia. The single point of light at the stern of the boat symbolizes both the nuclear propulsion plant that powers the submarine as well as the boat's data processing system fiber optic backbone. In keeping with the Commonwealth of Virginia's motto, the words "Sic Semper Tyrannis" (Latin for "Thus Always To Tyrants") appear at the bottom, which combined with the symbolism of the Commonwealth's Seal, represents the triumph of Virtue over tyranny.

The image of George Washington also looks forward with Virginia. George Washington, a Virginia native, has been characterized as the "indispensable man" vital to the formation of the American republic. In all of history, few men who possessed unassailable power have used that power so selflessly and wisely for the welfare of their countrymen and all mankind. Virginia also stands ready in all her indisputable power to serve the people of America and her allies."

Commemorative works

The Navy League of the United States commissioned Tom Liesegang to commemorate the USS Virginia in 2004. Ten prints were created for contractors and sponsors, including: Senator John Warner, Admiral Edmund Giambastiani and Lynda Bird Johnson Robb, the daughter of President Lyndon Johnson.

References 

 

Ships built in Groton, Connecticut
Virginia-class submarines
Nuclear submarines of the United States Navy
2003 ships
Submarines of the United States